The Antietam Avenue Bridge was located where Antietam Avenue passed over the Dequindre Cut (formerly owned by the Grand Trunk Western Railroad) in Detroit, Michigan. It has been demolished due to structural deficiencies and will be reconstructed. The original bridge was listed on the National Register of Historic Places in 2000.

History
By the 1920s, there were over 400 industries operating on Detroit's east side. However, the combination of the city's haphazard streetplan, the expansion of large factories, and the substantial network of rail tracks conspired to slow traffic within the city, particularly in the east-west direction. In 1923, the city of Detroit and Grand Trunk Western Railroad began a plan to build 22 grade separations; both parties agreed to share the cost.

One of the tracks to be regraded was the line paralleling St. Aubin. These tracks ran from the northwest, where they connected with a network of other lines, to the southeast, where the tracks turned to parallel the river and supplied a number of large factories, including the Detroit-Michigan Stove Plant, the United States Rubber Company Plant, and the Parke-Davis Laboratories. The tracks terminated at the Brush Street Depot in downtown Detroit.

By March 1930, sixteen of the crossings of what now is known as the "Dequindre Cut" were finished, including the nearby Chestnut Street Bridge. The bridge at Antietam Avenue was completed soon thereafter. In 1964, the Antietam Avenue Bridge and the Chestnut Street Bridge were teamed as a one-way pair. In the 1980s, the railway was abandoned, and ownership changed hands.

As of 2008, the Dequindre Cut is being turned into a rail trail.

Significance
The Dequindre Cut is in good condition, and the course of the Cut and how it relates to the street grid is apparent from the Antietam Avenue bridge. The bridge is good evidence of the grade separation effort early in the twentieth century.

However, as of 2008, the bridge has been demolished due to structural deficiencies and will be reconstructed.

See also

References

External links
Antietam Avenue Bridge from HistoricBridges.org: photographs of the original bridge and replacement slab.

Demolished bridges in the United States
Bridges in Detroit
Demolished buildings and structures in Detroit
Road bridges on the National Register of Historic Places in Michigan
Bridges completed in 1930
1930 establishments in Michigan
National Register of Historic Places in Detroit
Grand Trunk Western Railroad